Robert Robinson was an American football and basketball coach.  He was the head football coach at Wheaton College in Wheaton, Illinois, serving for one season in 1916 and compiling a record of 3–5. Robinson was also the head basketball coach at Wheaton for one season, in 1916–17, tallying a mark of 5–4.

References

Year of birth missing
Year of death missing
Wheaton Thunder football coaches
Wheaton Thunder men's basketball coaches